The Miss Kentucky Teen USA competition is the pageant that selects the representative for the state of Kentucky in the Miss Teen USA pageant.

Gabriella Hembree of Carrollton was crowned Miss Kentucky Teen USA 2022 on March 26, 2022 at The Center for Rural Development in Somerset. She represented Kentucky at Miss Teen USA 2022 in Reno, Nevada.

Eligibility 
The participant must be a single, legally recognized female between the ages of 14–18 years old. Specifically, the contestant has to be under 19 years old before January 1 of the pageant year. Also, the applicant must have never been married, pregnant, or had a marriage annulled. A contestant can only be eligible if she is a United States citizen and remains a United States citizen throughout the competition at both a state and national level. She must have lived in the state she desires to compete in permanently, at least six months prior to the pageant date, or be a full-time student in the state with one semester completed by December 31 of the pageant year.

Results summary

Placement at Miss Teen USA
1st runners-up: Kristi Dawn Hicks (1989)
2nd runners-up: Krista Keith (1983), Kristen Johnson (2000), Tara Conner (2002)
Top 6: April Vaughn (1990)
Top 10: Lexie Kemper (1999), Amanda Nunnelley (2003)
Top 12: Brittany Johnson (1995)
Top 15: Sarah Withers (2005), Jefra Bland (2009), Taylor Hubbard (2010)
Kentucky holds a record of 11 placements at Miss Teen USA.

Awards
Miss Photogenic: Lexie Kemper (1999), Kristen Johnson (2000)

Winners 

1 Age at the time of the Miss Teen USA pageant

References

External links
Official website

Beauty pageants in Kentucky
Kentucky
Women in Kentucky
Organizations based in Louisville, Kentucky